Mari Selvaraj is an Indian film director and author who works in the Tamil film industry. He worked as an Assistant Director for director Ram, He made his directorial debut with Pariyerum Perumal, which opened to positive reviews and received many awards and accolades. After he paired up with actor Dhanush for a movie Karnan, which opened positive reviews and was successful at the box office in the year 2021

Film career 
Mari Selvaraj entered the Tamil film industry in 2006. He initially planned to become an actor, but later he joined film director Ram and worked as an assistant director in three films: Kattradhu Thamizh (2007), Thanga Meenkal (2013), and Taramani (2017). In 2018, he directed his first film, Pariyerum Perumal, which garnered critical acclaim and was one of the successful films of the year. His second film, Karnan starring Dhanush opened to a rousing reception from the masses and critics. Karnan is charged with a universal artistic and political resonance.

Filmography

Awards and nominations

Other works 

 Marakkave Ninaikkiren, a series in Tamil Magazine Ananda Vikatan. 
 Thamirabaraniyil Kollapadathavargal, short stories collection published in 2013 by Vamsi Pathipagam. This is Mari Selvaraj's Debut fiction

References

External links 
 

Tamil-language film directors
Year of birth missing (living people)
Living people